Nobleton Airport, formerly , was located  north of Nobleton, Ontario, Canada. It was a private airport, and was run by Beacon Hill Airpark Ltd.  Its runways were made of turf.

The airstrip is now site of 4 residential properties but the outline of the turf runway is still visible from the air.

References

Defunct airports in Ontario
Transport in King, Ontario